The Oklahoma Core Curriculum Tests are standards-aligned tests designed to meet NCLB requirements. The following tests are administered:

Additionally, the Oklahoma Core Curriculum Tests report out Lexile measures for students in grades 3–8. A Lexile measure can be used to match readers with targeted text and monitor growth in reading ability.

References

Education in Oklahoma
Standardized tests in the United States